Lists of war monuments and memorials

Australia
 List of Australian military memorials

Canada
 List of Canadian war memorials

Belgium
 List of World War I memorials and cemeteries in Flanders

Bosnia and Herzegovina
List of World War II monuments and memorials in Bosnia and Herzegovina

Croatia
List of World War II monuments and memorials in Croatia

France
 List of World War I memorials and cemeteries in the Somme
 List of World War I memorials and cemeteries in Champagne-Ardennes

Montenegro
 List of Yugoslav World War II monuments and memorials in Montenegro

North Macedonia
List of World War II monuments and memorials in North Macedonia

Serbia
 List of Yugoslav World War II monuments and memorials in Serbia

Slovenia
List of World War II monuments and memorials in Slovenia

United Kingdom
 Grade I listed war memorials in England
 Grade II* listed war memorials in England
 List of War Memorial windows by Christopher Whall

United States
 List of Confederate monuments and memorials
 List of Union Civil War monuments and memorials
 List of Vietnam War memorials
 List of New York City parks relating to the Vietnam War
 List of monuments of the Gettysburg Battlefield

See also
 List of Korean War memorials
 List of World War I monuments and memorials